Michel Collon is a Belgian writer, and journalist for the magazine of the Marxist Workers' Party of Belgium and for his own website Investig’Action.

Biography 
Michel Collon started his career in the Belgian weekly Solidaire. He continued his work independently by writing books, making films and an Internet newsletter broadcast to 40 000 subscribers. He is affiliated with the Workers Party of Belgium, and has organised a network of civil observers in Yugoslavia and in Iraq. He took part in the anti-imperialist conference Axis for Peace.

Michel Collon denounced the misuse by Dalai Lama of a photograph that implied Chinese soldiers had dressed up as Buddhist monks and had provoked the 2008 Tibetan unrest. According to the Los Angeles Times, this photograph was taken from the Michelle Yeoh film The Touch, which was filmed in Lhassa between 2001 & 2002.

Propaganda disclosures 
He built his reputation through the promotion of complotist and red-green-brown theories.

Collon and his friends are also strong advocates of Eritrean dictator Isayas Afechercki.

Czechoslovak money 
In 1985, jointly with Jean Verstappen, Collon established "Rencontres pour la Paix". They received several hundred thousands of Belgian Franks from Czechoslovak authorities for their communistic publications.

Notes

External links
   
  

Belgian male writers
Belgian communists
Belgian political journalists
Anti-revisionists
Anti-globalization activists
Investigative journalists
Living people
1946 births
Male non-fiction writers